= Peddarikunta =

Peddarikunta is a small village and panchayath headquarter of Peddapanjani mandal, Chittoor district, Andhra Pradesh, India.

In this panchayath there are eight villages:

1. Chillappalle
2. Basapuram
3. Peddarikunta
4. Chinnarikunta
5. Gurivireddypalli
6. Pilligundlapalli
7. Reddyindlu
8. Anjaneyapuram
